The Federal Court of India was a judicial body, established in India in 1937 under the provisions of the Government of India Act 1935, with original, appellate and advisory jurisdiction. It functioned until the Supreme Court of India was established in 1950. Although the seat of the Federal Court was at Delhi, however, a separate Federal Court of Pakistan was established in Pakistan in Karachi after the Partition of India. There was a right of appeal to the Judicial Committee of the Privy Council in London from the Federal Court of India.

The Federal Court had exclusive original jurisdiction in any dispute between the Central Government and the Provinces. Initially, it was empowered to hear appeals from the High Courts of the provinces in the cases which involved the interpretation of any Section of the Government of India Act, 1935. From 5 January 1948 it was also empowered to hear appeals in those cases, which did not involve any interpretation of the Government of India Act, 1935.

History

The Federal Court came into being on 1 October 1937. The seat of the court was the Chamber of Princes in the Parliament building in Delhi. It began with a Chief Justice and two puisne judges. The first Chief Justice was Sir Maurice Gwyer and the other two judges were Sir Shah Muhammad Sulaiman and M. R. Jayakar. It functioned until the establishment of the Supreme Court of India on 28 January 1950, two days after India was declared a republic.

‡ – Date of Resignation
# – On 14 August 1947 Federal Court partitioned into the federal courts of India and Pakistan

See also

History of the Indian Subcontinent
History of the Republic of India
Supreme Court of India
Chief Justice of India
Judges of the Supreme Court of India
National Judicial Appointments Commission
Judicial activism in India
History of the Islamic Republic of Pakistan
Supreme Court of Pakistan (Judicial history)
Chief Justice of Pakistan
Justices of the Supreme Court of Pakistan
Supreme Court Bar Association
Judicial activism (Lawyers' movement)

Notes

Further reading

 Pylee, M.V. (1996). The Federal Court Of India, New Delhi: Vikas Publishing House,

External links
 Federal Court (Enlargement of Jurisdiction) Act, 1947

1937 establishments in British India
Courts and tribunals established in 1937
1950 disestablishments in India
Judiciary of India
Judiciary of Pakistan